Jardins du Trocadéro (Gardens of the Trocadero) is an open space in Paris, located in the 16th arrondissement of Paris, bounded to the northwest by the wings of the Palais de Chaillot and to the southeast by the Seine and the Pont d'Iéna, with the Eiffel Tower on the opposite bank of the Seine.

The main feature, called the Fountain of Warsaw, is a long basin, or water mirror, with twelve fountain creating columns of water 12 metres high; twenty four smaller fountains four metres high; and ten arches of water. At one end, facing the Seine, are twenty powerful water cannons, able to project a jet of water fifty metres. Above the long basin are two smaller basins, linked with the lower basin by cascades flanked by 32 sprays of water four meters high.  These fountains are the only exposition fountains which still exist today, and still function as they once did.  In 2011, the fountain's waterworks were completely renovated and a modern pumping system was installed.

History

The entire site was formerly the garden of the original Palais du Trocadéro, laid out by Adolphe Alphand for the Exposition Universelle (1878).

The present garden has an area of 93,930 m2, and was created for the Exposition Internationale des Arts et Techniques dans la Vie Moderne (1937).  This was the design of Parisian architect Roger-Henri Expert. 
During the exposition in 1937, the pavillons of Nazi Germany and the Soviet Union were facing each other on opposite sides of the Jardins du Trocadéro.

The grounds will host the opening ceremony of the 2024 Summer Olympics.

Statuary 
With sloping fairways that run along the river, the garden terraces feature a number of sculptures, some dating from the 1930s, including:

 at the first level below the Palais de Chaillot, the matching stone statues L'Homme by Pierre Traverse, and La Femme by Daniel Bacqué, both leaning against stone pedestals
 two gilded bronze fountain sculptures in their own square basins, Bull and Deer by Paul Jouve and Horses and Dog by Georges Guyot
 21-foot bronze Apollo with lyre (or Apollon musagète) group by sculptor Henri Bouchard
 a matching 21-foot bronze Hercules with bull, by Albert Pommier
 two matching stone groups on pedestals towards the southeastern end of the fountain, La Joie de vivre, by Léon-Ernest Drivier and Youth by Pierre Poisson

Access

References

Sources

 this article partially sourced from French Wikipedia, sourced 9/11/2010

Fountains in Paris
Trocadéro, Jardins du
16th arrondissement of Paris
World's fair sites in Paris
Buildings and structures in the 16th arrondissement of Paris
Exposition Internationale des Arts et Techniques dans la Vie Moderne